Teres Shulkowsky (born December 28, 1989, in Netanya, Israel) is an Israeli football defender currently playing for the Maccabi Yavne football club. He has also played for Maccabi Netanya, Maccabi Ironi Jatt, Hapoel Hadera and Hapoel Kfar Shalem.

Shulkowsky started his career on the youth team of Maccabi Netanya. In 2009, he made his debut for the senior team in the Israeli Premier League.

References

1989 births
Living people
Israeli Jews
Israeli footballers
Maccabi Netanya F.C. players
Maccabi Ironi Jatt F.C. players
Hapoel Hadera F.C. players
Hapoel Kfar Shalem F.C. players
Hapoel Nof HaGalil F.C. players
Hapoel Afula F.C. players
Hapoel Migdal HaEmek F.C. players
Ironi Nesher F.C. players
Maccabi Ironi Kiryat Ata F.C. players
Hapoel Iksal F.C. players
Hapoel Ironi Baqa al-Gharbiyye F.C. players
Hapoel Herzliya F.C. players
Hapoel Bnei Zalafa F.C. players
Maccabi Yavne F.C. players
Liga Leumit players
Footballers from Hadera
Israeli people of Russian-Jewish descent
Association football defenders